James Johnston was a politician in Queensland, Australia. He was a Member of the Queensland Legislative Assembly.

Early life 
He was born in Edinburgh, Scotland in 1820.  He was the son of Robert Melrose and Jane Johnston.  He formerly belonged to the Presbyterian church, but later converted to the Baptist church.

Family history 
He married Ellen Severight in Dundee, Scotland. Together they had 6 sons and 3 daughters.

Career 
He had a career as a Night School teacher.

Parliamentary career 
On 7 July 1876, he was elected to the Queensland parliament as the member for the electoral district of Bulimba, but served only 119 days before his death in Brisbane, Queensland, Australia on 3 November 1876.

References

Members of the Queensland Legislative Assembly
1820 births
1876 deaths
19th-century Australian politicians